64 Draconis is a single star in the northern circumpolar constellation of Draco, located 452 light years away. It has the Bayer designation of e Draconis; 64 Draconis is the Flamsteed designation. The object is visible to the naked eye as a dim, red-hued star with an apparent visual magnitude of 5.27.

This is an evolved red giant star with a stellar classification of M1 III, currently on the asymptotic giant branch. The latter is a suspected variable with a brightness range in the Hipparcos photometric filter of 5.29 to 5.33.

References

M-type giants
Suspected variables
Draco (constellation)
Draconis, 64
Durchmusterung objects
190544
98583
7676